The Senate Homeland Security and Governmental Affairs Ad Hoc Subcommittee on Contracting Oversight is one of the six subcommittees within the Senate Committee on Homeland Security and Governmental Affairs

The Subcommittee is an ad hoc subcommittee, meaning "for this purpose." Ad Hoc committees are created for a single issue, and are disbanded after the issue is resolved.

Members, 112th Congress
The subcommittee was chaired by Democrat Claire McCaskill of Missouri, and the Ranking Minority Member was Republican Rob Portman of Ohio.

References

External links
Committee on Homeland Security and Governmental Affairs, Contracting Oversight Subcommittee page

Ad hoc committees
Government procurement in the United States
Homeland Security Subcommittee on Contracting Oversight